Pégase was a 74-gun ship of the line of the French Navy, lead ship of  her class, launched in 1781.

Career 
Pégase took part in the Battle of Ushant on 21 April 1782. She was captured by HMS Foudroyant, under Captain John Jervis. Jervis was invested Knight of the Order of the Bath for the capture.

Pégase was bought into the Navy and commissioned as the third rate HMS Pegase. She served as a prison ship in Portsmouth from 1799, and was broken up in 1815.

See also
List of ships captured in the 18th century

Notes

References

Lavery, Brian (2003) The Ship of the Line - Volume 1: The development of the battlefleet 1650-1850. Conway Maritime Press. .

Winfield, Rif and Roberts, Stephen (2015) French Warships in the Age of Sail 1786-1861: Design, Construction, Careers and Fates. Seaforth Publishing. .

Ships of the line of the French Navy
Ships of the line of the Royal Navy
1781 ships
Captured ships
Pégase-class ships of the line